Jeffrey "Jeff" Salmon (born 1953) is a British businessman and an art dealer both through his own companies and on the Channel 4 programme, Four Rooms. Salmon lists amongst his clients, Kate Moss, Lily Allen, Uma Thurman and U2 guitarist Adam Clayton.

Background
Originally from East London, Salmon worked for Sotheby's between 1970 and 1977. Aged 24, he set up his own business specialising in art nouveau and art-deco. Dealing in mainly in mid-20th-century design he owns businesses, based in Marylebone, London. They include Decoratum, which encompasses the two largest 20th-century furniture and design galleries in London. It was listed by The Guardian newspaper as one of the most favourite shops in west London. Salmon also runs a number of other companies in areas such as health care, air conditioning and facilities for people with disabilities as well as owning the rights to His Excellency, a Gilbert and Sullivan style opera. Salmon lives with his partner Lucia and has four children. His daughter Polly records music under the name GFOTY.

Television
In 2010, Salmon was picked as one of the four dealers to appear in Four Rooms after a Channel 4 researcher visited his gallery. The programme sees the dealers attempt to buy extraordinary and unique items from members of the public. The show began airing in 2011, although Salmon left the show after the second series in 2012. He returned two years later (in 2014) for the fourth series of the show.

Companies

Decoratum
Dealing with vintage furniture and lighting "only by appointment" from a large warehouse in Wembley whilst running other businesses and exhibiting at various large London Art and Antique Fairs, Salmon opened Decoratum in 2005, a gallery space covering almost 5000 square feet of floor space in the basement of the world-famous Alfie's Antiques Market in a Church Street, in London's fashionable Marylebone District. The gallery was made up of 14 different spaces and room settings. Salmon closed the gallery in 2010 to replace it with the street level gallery also called Decoratum. The gallery often hosts exhibitions of contemporary designers.
Salmon has been often quoted on the philosophy behind Decoratum: "We won't buy a piece just because we think there may be a profit in it. We will only buy a piece if we love it enough to be willing to have it on display in our own homes should it fail to sell."

Cucumberman and The Air Conditioning Company
In 1988 Salmon set up a business renting portable air conditioning units to offices. The company was christened Cucumberman by Salmon's then 6-year-old son. A series of advertisements featuring Cucumberman as a super hero were aired each summer on radio stations across London and south east England. Salmon wrote and performed these, often singing and crying out the Cucumberman catchphrase "wooosh!".

In summer 2000, the company also entered the Fixed Installation Market for air conditioning systems.

Salmon Assessors - Insurance Assessors
Following damage sustained to a large shipment of art to New York in the early 1980s, Salmon successfully negotiated his own insurance claim. It became the foundation for a new business negotiating claims as an independent loss assessor on behalf of others, irrespective of their profession and including domestic claims.

Rollaramp (UK)
UK hire and sales of modular wheelchair access system, Rollaramp, is also a company within Salmon's The Salmon Group.

Fishfinger
In December 2013 Salmon created a new creative media agency called Fishfinger.

Rotai UK
In July 2022 Salmon created a new massage chair company called Rotai UK.

Writing
Salmon became a blogger for Huffington Post in August 2014, where he writes on matters to do with his businesses and wider society.

Salmon joined the UK business magazine Business Matters as a columnist in August 2013.

References

External links
 
 

Living people
1953 births
Channel 4 people
Art dealers from London
Businesspeople from London